Silverton is a small village at the far west of New South Wales, Australia,  north-west of Broken Hill.

The town sprang up after the discovery of rich silver deposits, although it was soon eclipsed by an even richer silver-lead-zinc ore body at nearby Broken Hill. The town is often referred to as a ghost town; however, there remains a small permanent population and mainly tourist related businesses.

History
The earliest human settlers in the area are thought to be the Wiljakali people, although this was probably only intermittent due to lack of permanent water sources. As in much of Australia, a combination of disease and aggression by white settlers drove them from their lands.

The first European to visit the area was the then Surveyor General of New South Wales, Major Thomas Mitchell, in 1841. Three years later, in 1844, the explorer Charles Sturt saw and named the Barrier Range while searching for an inland sea; the range was so named as it was a barrier to his progress north. Burke and Wills passed through the area in their famous 1860-61 expedition, setting up a base camp at nearby Menindee. Pastoralists first began settling the area in the 1850s, with the main trade route to the area along the Darling River.

Prospectors began working in the area in 1867 when a local station-hand claimed to have found gold there. It was later discovered that his plan was merely a pretext for stealing a horse.

Some years later in 1875, two men drilling a well on a station south of the town site hit a lode of silver. Silverton was recognised as a town on 17 September 1880 and Richard O'Connell was sent in charge of the police. Among his many other duties was Acting Clerk of Petty Sessions, Mining Registrar and Warden's Clerk.

In October 1886 the Silverton Municipal Council was formed and held its inaugural meeting in January 1887 in the Silverton Municipal Chambers, which still exist. The town's population quickly increased reaching a peak around 3,000 in the 1890s, and the Silverton Tramway was opened in 1888 connecting the town to South Australia.

Many of the houses built were of simple iron and canvas construction. The rapid depletion of the high-grade ore around Silverton, along with the discovery of an even richer silver-lead-zinc ore body in nearby Broken Hill led to a sudden decline in Silverton's population, with many of those leaving taking their homes with them.

20th century
By 1901 the town and immediate area was home to less than 300 people, but it remained popular as a venue for recreational outings by Broken Hill residents.  In 1915 The Battle of Broken Hill took place when a New Year's Day picnic train from Broken Hill to Silverton was attacked by a gunman from Afghanistan, and modern-day Pakistan.

Penrose Park, named after John Penrose, a pioneering brewer at Silverton, was the attraction for these picnic excursions.  Located beside Umberumberka Creek in a rare belt of greenery at the outskirts of Silverton, it was not so much a product of the early mining era at Silverton as of the mining boom at Broken Hill.  In 1893 it was the unsuccessful site for a racecourse.  Then for decades it became a picnic ground, but remained relatively neglected until the mid-1930s when the Broken Hill mining companies decided it was an admirable recreation site for their employees. Money was spent on upgrading sporting facilities, playgrounds, and parklands, such that throughout the 1940s and 50s it became a major recreational facility.  Huge annual picnics/fairs were held there by social and sporting clubs, and by mining companies. For example, it was reported that the eighth annual Zinc Mine employees picnic in 1941 attracted one fifth of the entire town of Broken Hill. The convoys of family cars headed to and from Broken Hill to Penrose Park were so heavy that it became one of the first sealed roads outside Broken Hill.  By the mid-1960s interest began to wane, as did support from the mining companies, and so the park fell into slow decline.  Penrose Park remains today, but is now a quiet public campground, popular with families and 'Grey Nomads'.  Although it is a mere shadow of its heyday half a century ago when it thronged with activity, many relics of that era remain.

Demographics
In the 2016 Australian census, Silverton inhabitants were 46.9% Male and 53.1% female with a median age of 53. It has a total of 12 families in 39 private dwellings with a median household income of $899 per week.

Present day

Silverton today is inhabited by a permanent population of only about 50 people, but its history and location make it a relatively popular tourist destination. Several artists live in or around the town, including Peter Browne, Albert Woodroffe and John Dynon, with some maintaining their own galleries. This is in line with the significant number of artists working out of nearby Broken Hill, as the surrounding landscape and lighting is particularly amenable to the creation of art.

Most of the original buildings have now vanished or lie in ruins, but there are some interesting buildings that remain, including the Silverton Hotel and the Silverton Gaol. By 2007, Silverton had been the scene for more than 140 films and commercials thanks to the light, the character-filled colonial buildings and its scenic desert surrounds.

The hotel has been seen in several productions, and its inside walls are covered with memorabilia. These productions include Razorback, The Adventures of Priscilla, Queen of the Desert, The Flying Doctors, and Dirty Deeds. A 'lookalike' of the famous Mad Max car the 'Interceptor' was on display outside the hotel from 2002 but has since been sold and is no longer there. There is now, however, a privately owned Mad Max 2 Museum that pays homage to the movie that was filmed in the region with much memorabilia and houses two Interceptor replicas. The Silverton Hotel was used in 800 Words as the location where Woody tracked down his wife to sign divorce papers.

Silverton cemetery
Just outside town, there is the Silverton cemetery. It houses 402 identified grave sites  and is 42 acres large.
It's located at Latitude: -31.874259 Longitude: 141.231716 GPS: 31 52.4556, 141 13.9032.

See also 
 Silverton Wind Farm

References

External links

Silverton Village Committee Community website

Unincorporated Far West Region
Ghost towns in New South Wales
Towns in New South Wales
Mining towns in New South Wales